Hypolycaena clenchi, the Clench's fairy hairstreak, is a butterfly in the family Lycaenidae. It is found in Sierra Leone, Liberia, Ivory Coast, Ghana and possibly Cameroon, the Republic of the Congo and Equatorial Guinea. The habitat consists of forests.

References

Butterflies described in 1997
Hypolycaenini